Sedwa is a Tehsil and block of Barmer district in Rajasthan, northern India.

Sedwa is a Town in south western barmer district it is tehsil and  Subdivisional Magistrate.
Most of its economy is dependent on farming mainly the spice cumin is produced in tonnes.

Banks

1. State Bank of India,  Sedwa
IFSC CODE : SBIN0031704 

2. Punjab National Bank, Sedwa
IFSC CODE :PUNB0878500 [2]

References

Villages in Barmer district
Tehsils of Rajasthan